Øystein Kristiansen (born 29 April 1975) is a Norwegian orienteering competitor and World champion. He won a gold medal both in the 2004 and the 2005 World Orienteering Championships with the Norwegian Relay team. He received an individual bronze medal in the middle distance at the 2003 World Orienteering Championships.

References

External links
 
 

1975 births
Living people
Norwegian orienteers
Male orienteers
Foot orienteers
World Orienteering Championships medalists
20th-century Norwegian people
21st-century Norwegian people